The Ritzihorn is a mountain of the Bernese Alps, overlooking Reckingen in the canton of Valais. It lies on the range south of the Galmihorn.

References

External links
Ritzihorn on Hikr

Mountains of the Alps
Mountains of Switzerland
Mountains of Valais
Two-thousanders of Switzerland